The 2020–21 BIBL season is the 12th edition of Balkan International Basketball League (BIBL). Besides 6 teams from Bulgaria, Montenegro and North Macedonia, 12 teams from Israel joined the competition, after temporary suspension of 2020-2021 Israeli Basketball League due to the COVID-19 pandemic. These 12 teams played inside of Israel in first round of regular season and the best two teams joined the other 4 Balkan teams, which qualified from the Balkan group.

Teams

First round

Group A

Group B

Group C

Group D

Group E

Second round playoff 
The winners from groups A, B, C and D will compete in a single match to qualify for the second round. The Group A winner will play against the Group C winner, and the Group B winner will play against the winner from Group D.

The hosting team will be decided based the following criteria in the Group stage:
 win–loss record
 game points difference
 game points scored.
If these criteria still cannot decide, a draw shall decide on the final classification.

|}

Second round 
The draw of this second round conducted on Friday February 5, at 11:00 EET, at Delasport Bulgaria offices in Sofia.

Qualified teams divided to two groups. Each group consist of two teams from the Balkan region and one team from Israel played in a round-robin-system. No teams from the same country can be drawn in one group.

Draw

Group F

Group G

Final Four
By League's official regulations, section 3, if two teams from the same country qualify to the Final Four they shall play each other in the Semifinals game. The Final Four will take place at Holon Toto Hall.

Semifinals

Third place

Final

References

External links 

 Official website
 Scoreboard
 Flashcore

2020-21
BIBL
2020–21 in North Macedonia basketball
2020–21 in Bulgarian basketball
2020–21 in Montenegrin basketball
2020–21 in Israeli basketball